
Gmina Przedbórz is an urban-rural gmina (administrative district) in Radomsko County, Łódź Voivodeship, in central Poland.

The gmina contains part of the protected area called Przedbórz Landscape Park.

Villages
Apart from the town of Przedbórz, Gmina Przedbórz contains the villages and settlements of Borowa, Brzostek, Chałupki, Faliszew, Gaj, Góry Mokre, Góry Suche, Grobla, Jabłonna, Józefów, Kajetanów, Kaleń, Miejskie Pola, Mojżeszów, Nosalewice, Piskorzeniec, Policzko, Przyłanki, Stara Wieś, Stary Józefów, Taras, Wojciechów, Wola Przedborska, Wygwizdów, Wymysłów, Zagacie, Żeleźnica and Zuzowy.

Neighbouring gminas
Gmina Przedbórz is bordered by the gminas of Aleksandrów, Fałków, Kluczewsko, Krasocin, Masłowice, Ręczno, Słupia and Wielgomłyny.

References
Polish official population figures 2006

Przedborz
Radomsko County